Peter Corp Dyrendal (January 1, 1976 in Ishøj, Denmark) is a Danish-Thai descent singer, recording artist, actor and model, who has had one acting role on Thai television (as a character who is a kayak instructor of Thai and New Zealand descent). His recording of Goom-Pah-Pun (กุมภาพันธ์) is the theme song for a Thai TV series that was produced in 2004. His recordings have been published by GMM Grammy.

Discography

Albums
Hin Pha Ga Darb (1998)
Magic Peter (1999)
X-Ray (2000)
Version 4.0 (2002)

Singles
Chao Tui Yoo Nai (Where are the buffaloes?)
Nub Dao (star counting)
Khor Kwam Sud Tai (The last message)
Ruk Mai Ruk (Love or not)
Khon Tee Yeun Throng Nee (The standing here man)

TV Dramas

TV Series

TV Sitcom

Film

Master of Ceremony: MC ON TV

References

External links
http://www.phuketwatch.com/thai-music-artists/peter.htm
(Danish text:) http://viden.jp.dk/undervisning/sites/altomasien/indsigt/temaartikler/default.asp?cid=4677

Peter Corp Dyrendal
Peter Corp Dyrendal
Peter Corp Dyrendal
Peter Corp Dyrendal
Peter Corp Dyrendal
Peter Corp Dyrendal
Thai television personalities
Living people
1975 births
People from Ishøj Municipality